Thomas Rajna (21 December 1928 – 16 July 2021) was a British pianist and composer of Hungarian birth. He had been domiciled in Cape Town in South Africa since 1970.

Biography
Rajna was born in Budapest, Hungary. He started to play the piano and compose at an early age and studied at the Franz Liszt Academy of Music where he won the Liszt Prize in 1947. That year he left Hungary to settle in London and enrolled at the Royal College of Music. He soon appeared at the Proms under such conductors as Carlo Maria Giulini, Colin Davis and John Pritchard, also becoming a frequent broadcaster at the BBC. In 1963 he was appointed Professor of Piano at the Guildhall School of Music and Drama.

His first commercial recording was the complete piano solo works of Igor Stravinsky. After that he recorded music by Alexander Scriabin, Robert Schumann and Olivier Messiaen, the piano part of Igor Stravinsky's Petrushka with the New Philharmonia under Erich Leinsdorf, and Béla Bartók's Music for Strings, Percussion and Celesta with Sir Georg Solti and the London Symphony Orchestra. He completed a cycle of recordings devoted to the entire piano music of Enrique Granados. Subsequently he undertook to record Franz Liszt's 12 Transcendental Etudes and 12 Etudes, Op. 1. Rajna often performed his own two piano concertos.

He settled with his family in Cape Town, South Africa in 1970 to take up an appointment at the Faculty of Music of the University of Cape Town (UCT), where he became associate professor of piano in 1989. In January 1981 he was awarded a University Fellowship by UCT and the same year received an Artes Award from the South African Broadcasting Corporation (SABC) for his series of radio programmes on Franz Liszt, entitled "A Lisztian Metamorphosis". He completed his Piano Concerto No. 2 in 1984. The following year he received a doctorate in music from UCT in recognition of his body of compositions.

During a 1990 visit to England he recorded the Schumann Piano Concerto with the BBC Philharmonic Orchestra and gave a recital of works by Ernő Dohnányi and himself. During the same year Rajna played the solo piano part in the first, and so far the only South African performance of Messiaen's monumental Turangalîla-Symphonie with the Cape Town Symphony Orchestra. His 1990 Harp Concerto had its European première in Copenhagen at the Fifth World Harp Congress in July 1993. This work and his Second Piano Concerto (with Rajna as soloist) were recorded by the National Symphony Orchestra of the SABC and released on CD in 1993. At the end of that year he retired from his post at the UCT College of Music.

His very first commercial recording, Stravinsky's complete solo piano works, which Rajna recorded in 1963, and which had been unavailable for 30 years, re-entered international circulation after the Dutch label, Emergo Classics, released their digitally remastered version in their Saga Classics series in 1993. In 1994 he completed Video Games for Orchestra and his opera Amarantha. The former Foundation for the Creative Arts commissioned these works as well as the Rhapsody for Clarinet and Orchestra  (1995), premièred by Robert Pickup, the NSO and Richard Cock in 1996. In the same year Rajna was a recipient of the UCT Book Award for his Harp Concerto. This annual award is given in recognition of outstanding contribution to any branch of learning and it was the first time that a musical composition was thus honoured. In 1997 Rajna received the Molteno Award for lifetime achievement from the Cape Tercentenary Foundation.

Rajna's Fantasy for Violin and Orchestra (1996), commissioned by the then Natal Philharmonic Orchestra, was premièred in Durban in 1998. Lyon and Healy Harps of Chicago commissioned his Suite for Violin and Harp for presentation at the Seventh World Harp Congress in Prague in July 1999. Anna Verkholantseva, winner of the 1997 Moscow international Harp Competition, who premiered this work in Prague, has since then made a CD of it and has given performances of the "Suite" with her violinist partner, Alexander Trostiansky, in Moscow, London, New York, Chicago and San Francisco. The opera Amarantha was premiered in November 2000 by Cape Town Opera in conjunction with the UCT Opera School.

In 2001 Rajna created his own CD label, Amarantha Records. His catalogue includes his performance of Goyescas by Granados, music by fellow Hungarian Dohnanyi, Messiaen's complete "Vingt regards", Bartok's 2nd and 3rd Piano Concertos, concertos by Schumann and Barber, Brahms' 2nd Piano Concerto, music by Scriabin and a selection of Rajna's representative compositions. The same year Rajna wrote Tarantulla for violin and piano in response to a commission for the 2002 Pretoria contest by the University of South Africa (Unisa) International String Competition. The Cape Town premiere of Video Games by the Cape Philharmonic Orchestra conducted by David de Villiers took place in August 2002 to public and critical acclaim. International violin virtuoso Mikhail Ovrutsky, who was the winner of the 2002 Pretoria string competition and who had performed Rajna's Tarantulla on that occasion, came to Cape Town to perform Rajna's Fantasy for Violin and Orchestra in May 2004. Rajna's Harp Concerto had its Swiss premiere in Basel in September 2004.

Rajna's recordings of the complete piano works of Granados, made in London for CRD in 1976, were reissued in 2004 on six CDs in a box set and distributed worldwide by Brilliant Classics. Between 2002 and 2004 Rajna completed another opera, Valley Song, based on the play by Athol Fugard. The premiere took place at the Spier Summer Arts Festival, Stellenbosch, in March 2005 and in 2007 the opera was revived at the Klein Karoo National Arts Festival in Oudtshoorn, where it gained prizes in two categories: best musical show and most promising newcomer (Golda Schultz, soprano, the opera's leading lady).

In 2006 he completed The Creation-A Negro Sermon for chorus and orchestra, written for the First Cape Town International Summer Music Festival in 2006. Rajna's Piano Preludes are part of the syllabus for the Teachers' Licentiate of Unisa. In response to a commission by Unisa to write a set piece for the new Grade 7 Piano Examination Album he completed his Oriental Feast in August 2006. His Violin Concerto (2007) premiered in October 2010 at the University of Stellenbosch.

In the course of celebrating Rajna's 80th birthday the Cape Philharmonic Orchestra performed extracts from Valley Song in a concert during the Third Cape Town International Summer Music Festival in November 2008. Rajna himself was the soloist in his 2nd Piano Concerto. Rajna prepared and reissued on his label a series of his landmark recordings of earlier vintage, now digitally remastered and available on CD for the first time. He released Brahms's B flat major and Schumann's A minor piano concertos, Liszt's Transcendental Studies coupled with their earliest version, the 12 Etudes, Op. 1, and Messiaen's Vingt regards sur l'enfant-Jésus. In the pipeline are piano concertos by Bartók, Stravinsky, Prokofiev and Barber, Bach harpsichord concertos and music by Scriabin and Dohnanyi.

Rajna died at the age of 92 in a hospital in Cape Town on 16 July 2021.

Compositions

Ballet
 Girl in a Mask, 1958 for the Western Theatre Ballet

Operas
 Amarantha, 2000
 Valley Song, based on the play by Athol Fugard, 2005

Filmography
 Seven Years in Tibet, 1956
 Jet Storm, 1959

Orchestral works
 Suite for Strings,1952–1954
 Movements for Strings, 1962
 Cantilenas and Interludes, 1968
 Divertimento Piccolo, 1987
 Video Games for orchestra, 1994

Concertante
 Piano Concerto No. 1, 1960–1962
 Piano Concerto No. 2, 1983–1984
 Concerto for Harp and Orchestra, 1990
 Rhapsody for Clarinet and Orchestra, 1995
 Fantasy for Violin and Orchestra, 1996
 Concerto for Violin and Orchestra, 2007

Chamber

Two players
 Music for clarinet and piano, 1947, Alphonse Leduc, Paris 1970
 Music for cello and piano, 1950
 Music for violin and piano, 1956–57, Accent Music, J'burg 1990
 Suite for violin and harp, 1997–98, Lyon & Healy, Chicago 1998
 Tarantulla for Violin and Piano, Amarantha Music 2001

Four players
 String Quartet, 1948

Ensemble 
 Serenade for ten wind instruments, percussion, cimbalom (or marimba) and piano/celesta

Piano 
 Preludes for piano, 1947–1950, Accent Music, J'burg 1988 – Amarantha Music, Cape Town 2002
 Capriccio for piano (or harpsichord), 1960
 Oriental Feast 2006, Unisa/Amarantha Music, 200?

Vocal 

 Four Early Songs for high voice and piano
 Cradle Song (William Blake), 1948
 Piping Down the Valleys Wild (William Blake), 1948
 Meeting at Night (Robert Browning), 1948
 Solfeggio, 1949
  Four Traditional African Lyrics for high voice and piano, 1975
 The Sorrow of Kodio
 Idyll
 Serenade
 Cuckold contented
 "Stop All the Clocks"  for middle voice and piano, Four songs on poems by W. H. Auden, 1998
 Stop All the Clocks
 The Composer
 Their Lonely Betters
 Refugee Blues
Poems used by kind permission of Curtis Brown Ltd., London, on behalf of the Estate of W. H. Auden, the copyright holders.

Choral
  Three Hebrew Choruses, 1972–73
 Adonai ma-adam
 Hashkivenu
 Laila mistereia
  The Creation- A Negro Sermon (JW Johnson), 2000, for unaccompanied mixed chorus, Amarantha Music
  The Creation – A Negro Sermon (JW Johnson), 2005–06 for chorus and orchestra, Amarantha Music

References

External links
 
 Athol Fugard's Valley Song has been set to music by composer Thomas Rajna, writes Guy Willoughby, the instigator of the project
 Songs for a Year and a Day by Erik Chisholm, Thomas Rajna and Victor Hely-Hutchinson

 Rajna going strong as he approaches 70

1928 births
2021 deaths
Hungarian emigrants to the United Kingdom
British emigrants to South Africa
South African Jews
South African composers
South African male composers
Alumni of the Royal College of Music
Academic staff of the University of Cape Town
Franz Liszt Academy of Music alumni
South African people of Hungarian-Jewish descent
Hungarian classical pianists
British classical pianists
South African classical pianists